Karl Jaeger (April 12, 1930 – November 3, 2015) was an American educator, writer and artist.

Early life and education

Karl graduated with a bachelor's degree in Education from Ohio State University and a master's degree in Education from Harvard University.

Career
Karl Jaeger was co-founder, Trustee and Chairman of Our Future Planet (OFP), Our Future Planet is a website and online community with a worldwide Citizenship. The mission of Our Future Planet is to provide an environment for people to create a better planet to live on and to share innovative approaches to enhance the quality, liveability and beauty of the Earth. Citizens can create profiles and add their own proposals on an Ideas Globe and join in discussions with other Citizens on WikiVisions.”. Other Trustees of Our Future Planet are Samantha Harvey, Jean Houston and James Gillis Lengel.

Karl was the creator of several community design projects including the Cambridge Charter School system a student-centered secondary school which received approval from the Massachusetts Department of Education on March 14, 1996.

Karl was Founder and Executive Director of the International School of America established in 1958, since renamed the International Honors Program. The International School of America organizes 8-month multi-country study abroad programs for university students to maximize the educational benefits from international travel. Students stay with host families in six to nine destinations during an eight-month academic year learning about social, urban and rural organizations, value systems, family structure, sustainability, ecology, anthropology, and educational systems. Karl has previously taught and led five travel programs around the globe for the International School of America.

Artworks
Jaeger's artwork and kinetic sculptures are presented in many major museums in the world. Karl designed a habitable sculpture to be built in Maine. It is an abstract work of garden sculpture that people can walk through and even live in. The walk through sculpture offers a series of discoveries – both outside and inside and there are views from each area of the sculpture – there are views of the mountains other views of rocks and trees and water building up into a complete view of mountains, rocks and natural habitats from the glass-enclosed spaces.

The garden and the habitable sculpture are linked together by glass openings with their own alterable degrees of varied apertures. The edifice is also a round theatre with dramatic events triggered either by nature during the day and night and by electric illumination of the garden elements or visual movement within the mirrored cube.

Karl was also a collector of postcards and had over 80,000 postcards collected from around the world.

References

National Geographic Magazine, July 1962:  36-page description of the International School of America's round-the-world trip.

1930 births
2015 deaths
American educators
American artists
American male writers
Harvard Graduate School of Education alumni
Ohio State University College of Education and Human Ecology alumni
Deltiologists